Wang Cheng-che (born 22 April 1949) is a Taiwanese alpine skier. He competed in two events at the 1972 Winter Olympics.

References

1949 births
Living people
Taiwanese male alpine skiers
Olympic alpine skiers of Taiwan
Alpine skiers at the 1972 Winter Olympics
Place of birth missing (living people)